Robert Gouger (26 June 1802 – 4 August 1846) was one of the founders of South Australia and the first Colonial Secretary of South Australia.

Early life
Gouger was the fifth son of nine children of George Gouger (1763–1802), who was a prosperous city merchant, and his wife Anne, née Sibley. Robert was educated at Nottingham, England, and on leaving school he entered his father's office.

He became friendly with Robert Owen of Lanark and, influenced by him, began taking an interest in social issues. In 1829 Gouger became associated with Edward Gibbon Wakefield and assisted him in advocating his colonization schemes. In this year Wakefield published his "Letters from Sydney" in the Spectator and these later appeared as  A Letter from Sydney edited by Robert Gouger. In the same year Gouger forwarded Wakefield's pamphlet, a Sketch of a Proposal for Colonizing Australia, to the Colonial Office, but received no encouragement.

In November 1829, Gouger ended up in King's Bench Prison as a result of a debt to the printer. There he shared a cell with Anthony Bacon (1796–1864) and first learned about southern Australia from Captain Henry Dixon.

Gouger's brother soon rescued him and he began to distribute copies of the Letter, but won little support until he approached Wilmot Horton for help in forming a society for assisting pauper emigration to the colonies. From this embryo was born the National Colonization Society, with Gouger as its secretary, but it failed on theoretical details after Wakefield was released from Newgate in May 1830. Later on he was associated with another book published in 1831, The State of New South Wales in December 1830; in a Letter (addressed to R . Gouger; with remarks by him). In 1830 Gouger and others went to Spain to fight for the constitutional cause and saw active service.

Colonial secretary
In the years between 1830 and 1834 various colonization schemes were brought forward and Gouger was active in their promulgation. Some of these schemes were intended to be money-making, but the South Australian Association, founded in December 1833 with Gouger as honorary secretary, was principally philanthropic in its objects. Gouger worked untiringly with Wakefield, many obstacles had to be surmounted and many compromises made, but in August 1834 the act for the establishment of South Australia became law. In May 1835 Gouger applied for the position of colonial secretary for South Australia.

He disagreed strongly with Wakefield about the price to be asked for land in the new colony and they became estranged in June 1835. He had been married to Harriet Jackson on 22 October 1835. They landed in South Australia on 10 November 1836. On 28 December 1836, as senior member of the council, Gouger administered the oaths of office to the newly arrived governor Sir John Hindmarsh.

Gouger had a troubled time in South Australia, and to the many discomforts of a new settlement was added anxiety for his wife's health. She died on 14 March 1837 and his infant son died two days later. The quarrels between the governor and Colonel William Light caused much dissension and created many difficulties for Gouger, who was eventually suspended on a charge of having struck Osmond Gilles the colonial treasurer. He felt this very deeply and the sympathy of his many friends could not atone for what he considered to be a great injustice. On 8 November 1837 he left for England to lay his case before the government.

On his arrival in July 1838 he found that he had been reinstated and Governor Hindmarsh recalled. He had busied himself on the voyage in preparing South Australia in 1837 in a Series of Letters. This was published soon after his arrival, and a second edition was called for in the same year. At the end of the year he was gratified to receive a present of a piece of plate from the leading colonists of South Australia as a tribute to his exertions in founding the colony.

In February 1839 he started on his return journey and reached Adelaide in June. Gouger found that the new governor, Colonel Gawler, was beset with difficulties in which Gouger shared. He eventually felt that the strain was too great and asked that he might resign his position and take up the less exacting one of colonial treasurer. He continued in this position until 1844 when he resigned on account of his health and returned to England on board the Symmetry, leaving Port Adelaide on 16 December 1844, and sailing via Cape Town, under Captain Elder. Upon reaching England, the Symmetry called first at Deal, Kent on 11 May 1845, before anchoring at London on 12 May.

Gouger was a member of the South Australian Legislative Council from 28 December 1836 to 22 August 1837 and 8 July 1839 to 16 October 1841.

Personal life
Gouger was a committed member of Freemasonry and a founding member of the South Australian Lodge of Friendship. He was elected and initiated into the Craft at the first meeting of that Lodge which was held on 27 November 1834 at the South Australian Association in London.  This Lodge was especially founded to become the first Lodge in the yet to be proclaimed colony of South Australia.

Legacy
Gouger died in Kensington, London on 4 August 1846. About the end of 1838 he had married Sarah Whitten. Their daughter, Adelaide Gouger, preserved his journals and papers, which formed the basis of Hodder's The Founding of South Australia.

Gouger has an honoured place among the founders of South Australia. Wakefield was the controlling mind, but Gouger was his able and hard-working representative at a time when it was impossible for Wakefield to take any prominent part in affairs. When they finally disagreed Gouger held firmly to his own views, and later on showed himself to be an efficient public servant during the difficult times attending the birth of the colony.

Gouger Street in Adelaide was named in his honour.

See also
 French Australian

References

Sources
Gouger, Robert (1802 - 1846), Australian Dictionary of Biography, Volume 1, Melbourne University Press, 1966, pp 461–463. 
Gouger Street, History of Adelaide Through Street Names: Streets Named on 23 May 1837 (Archived page, historysouthaustralia.net)

Further reading

|-

|-

|-

|-

1802 births
1846 deaths
Settlers of South Australia
English emigrants to colonial Australia
Treasurers of South Australia
Members of the South Australian Legislative Council
19th-century Australian politicians
19th-century Australian public servants